The men's individual rapid competition at the 2010 Asian Games in Guangzhou was held from 13 November to 16 November at the Guangzhou Chess Institute.

Schedule
All times are China Standard Time (UTC+08:00)

Results
Legend
HH — Head to head
Rtg — FIDE rating
RtgAvg — Average of the ratings of the opponents (without one result)
WO — Walkover

Round 1

Round 2

Round 3

Round 4

Round 5

Round 6

Round 7

Round 8

Round 9

Summary

References 

Results

Chess at the 2010 Asian Games